Cedi House is a 14-storey building in Accra, Ghana that houses the Bank of Ghana and the Ghana Stock Exchange.

History

Location
Cedi House is located at Victoria Borg on the main Independence Avenue in Ridge Accra

Tenants
 Bank of Ghana All floors except 4th
 Ghana Stock Exchange 4th Floor

References

Commercial buildings in Ghana
Skyscraper office buildings
Skyscrapers in Africa
Buildings and structures in Accra
Office buildings completed in 1973